Baldwin Hyde (died 16 August 1472) was a Canon of Windsor from 1469 to 1472 and Clerk of the Parliaments 1470 - 1471.

Career

He was appointed:
Prebendary of Hollington in St Mary-in-the-Castle, Hastings
Clerk in Chancery
Clerk of the Parliaments 1470 - 1471

He was appointed to the eighth stall in St George's Chapel, Windsor Castle in 1469 and held the canonry until 1472.

Notes 

1472 deaths
Canons of Windsor
Year of birth missing
Clerks of the Parliaments